Camponotus reticulatus is a species of carpenter ant (genus Camponotus). It is found from many Afrotropical, Indo-Australian, Oriental, Palaearctic regional countries and in Singapore.

Subspecies
Camponotus reticulatus fullawayi Wheeler, W.M., 1912 - Guam
Camponotus reticulatus gestiens Forel, 1915 - Indonesia
Camponotus reticulatus imparilis Forel, 1915 - Indonesia
Camponotus reticulatus jagori Stitz, 1925 - Philippines
Camponotus reticulatus latitans Forel, 1893 - India
Camponotus reticulatus reticulatus Roger, 1863 - India
Camponotus reticulatus sericellus Viehmeyer, 1916 - Singapore
Camponotus reticulatus yerburyi Forel, 1893 - Sri Lanka

References

External links

 at antwiki.org
Itis.gov
Animaldiversity.org

reticulatus
Hymenoptera of Asia
Insects described in 1863